The Nathan Cooper Gristmill is a historic gristmill on the Black River located at 66 NJ Route 24 in Chester Township, Morris County, New Jersey. It was added to the National Register of Historic Places on November 21, 1976 for its significance in industry.

History
From the 1760s until 1788 Isaiah Younglove milled flour on the site. Several other millers owned the mill, until Nathan Cooper (1751–1834) constructed the present mill in 1826. Later, Nathan A. Cooper (1802–1879) inherited this mill when his uncle Nathan died. Nathan A. built a house nearby for his son, Abram W. Cooper (1848–1933), who later inherited the mill from his father. This building is now used as the visitor center. The mill is currently kept in operating condition, with the large water wheel turning shafts and gears that turn 2,000-pound mill stones. The Morris County Parks Commission owns and operates the mill. 

The Friends of Fosterfields and Cooper Gristmill, a non-profit organization, contributes money and expertise to run the mill.

Gallery

See also
National Register of Historic Places listings in Morris County, New Jersey
General Nathan Cooper Mansion

References

External links

 
 

Chester Township, New Jersey
Industrial buildings completed in 1826
Buildings and structures in Morris County, New Jersey
National Register of Historic Places in Morris County, New Jersey
New Jersey Register of Historic Places
1826 establishments in New Jersey
Museums in Morris County, New Jersey
Mill museums in the United States
Grinding mills on the National Register of Historic Places in New Jersey